Wood River Wetland is a marsh wetland and freshwater ecoregion in the heart of Klamath County in Southern Oregon. The wetland neighbors the north shore of Agency Lake and is the focus of a Bureau of Land Management river channel restoration project from agricultural land. 

The wetland is flooded by the Wood River, with headwaters that emanate from a large natural spring located in Jackson F. Kimball State Recreation Site that feeds from an aquifer in the east side drainage of Crater Lake National Park. The wetlands is home to a rich biodiversity of wetland vegetation as well as local and migratory fauna of waterfowl.

Access 
Chiloquin and Fort Klamath are the nearest towns to the wetland and is situated off the Oregon Route 62.

Restoration
Since the early 1990s, the Lakeview District of the BLM has been restoring the Wood River Wetland to promote the strengthening of historic meandering flow patterns and improve fish passage and habitat for native fish.

References

Bodies of water of Klamath County, Oregon
Klamath River